A hypogeum or hypogaeum (plural hypogea or hypogaea, pronounced ; literally meaning "underground", from Greek hypo (under) and ghê (earth)) is an underground temple or tomb.

Hypogea will often contain niches for cremated human remains or loculi for buried remains. Occasionally tombs of this type are referred to as built tombs.

The term hypogeum can also refer to any antique building or part of building built below ground such as the series of tunnels under the Colosseum which held slaves (particularly enemy captives) and animals while keeping them ready to fight in the gladiatorial games. The animals and slaves could be let up through trapdoors under the sand-covered arena at any time during a fight.

Examples
An early example of a hypogeum is found at the Minoan Bronze Age site of Knossos on Crete. Hogan notes this underground vault was of a beehive shape and cut into the soft rock. In Larnaka, Cyprus—the Lefkaritis Tomb was discovered in 1999.

Hypogea were also found in Dynastic Egypt, such as at the Northern Mazghuna pyramid, Southern Mazghuna pyramid and Southern South Saqqara pyramid. The hypogea in ancient Palmyra contained loculi closed with slabs bearing sculptured portrait reliefs, and sarcophagi with sculptured family banqueting scenes on their lids.

The later Christians built similar underground shrines, crypts and tombs, which they called catacombs. But this was only a difference in name, rather than purpose and rituals, and archaeological and historical research shows they were effectively the same. Werner Jacobsen wrote:

Hypogea were constructed across the pre-Columbian New World during the first millennium AD. Some of these tombs were over 10 meters in diameter and contained two or three free-standing columns, ornamental pilasters, and side chambers. The largest concentration of these hypogea are found in the National Archeological Park of Tierradentro, a UNESCO World Heritage Site in southwest Colombia.

Other subterranean constructions
Other excavated structures, not used for ritual purposes, include the Greco-Roman cryptoporticus. Other cultures also have constructed underground structures, including the dugout, souterrain, yaodong, fogou, erdstall, and kiva.

Notes

References

External links

Hypogeum of the Volumnis digital media archive (creative commons-licensed photos, laser scans, panoramas), data from a University of Ferrara/CyArk research partnership

Subterranea (geography)